Ataur Rahman Mazarbhuiya was an All India United Democratic Front politician from Assam. He has been elected in Assam Legislative Assembly election in 2006 and 2011 from Katigorah constituency. He joined Indian National Congress before the assembly election in 2016 and contested from that party. He is also a religious leader, a frontline leader of Nadwatut Tameer (an Islamic Organization). He is also the editor of Monthly Neda-E-Deen.

References 

Living people
All India United Democratic Front politicians
21st-century Indian politicians
Members of the Assam Legislative Assembly
People from Cachar district
Year of birth missing (living people)
21st-century Bengalis
Bengali Muslims